The Shops at Don Mills (corporately known as CF Shops at Don Mills) is a lifestyle centre-type shopping centre in Toronto, Ontario, Canada, located at Don Mills Road and Lawrence Avenue East in Toronto. There are 72 retail stores with a total floor space of 47,550 square metres (or 511,824 square feet).

Character
Storefronts face a network of private internal streets, and the centre layout is centred on a square which includes interpretive historical plaques and commissioned art by Douglas Coupland. The layout is similar to a regular neighbourhood retail strip. Anchors include Salomon Toronto, McEwans Gourmet Market, Anthropologie, Joey's west coast restaurant and other shops and restaurants. Parking along the internal streets is limited but a multi-level parkade is located on site.

History
The centre is located on the site of the demolished Don Mills Centre shopping mall. Increased competition from other shopping malls and the closure of main anchor tenant T. Eaton Co. meant declines in mall revenues and the exodus of many fashion retailers. The mall owner, developer Cadillac Fairview, decided to redevelop the site in 2003 to attract more up-scale retailers and shoppers, without a main anchor tenant. The developer proposed to demolish the indoor shopping mall and replace it with an open-air setting, along with an intensification of the site. The intensification meant the construction of a parking garage to replace the large surface parking lot. The development also included using Centre lands for new residential buildings. After community consultation, the plan was approved by the City of Toronto and the development proceeded. The Shops at Don Mills opened on April 22, 2009.

McNally Robinson, a Canadian book-selling chain, was one of the first tenants, but the chain later decided to close the location.

Street names

A number of roads and driveways located in the development are named after prominent community members of the Don Mills area:

 Aggie Hogg Gardens - named for former resident, storekeeper, postmaster and daughter of settler John Hogg
 Clock Tower Road - named to identify the location of the Clock Tower at the corner of the Town Square.
 O'Neill Road - named for local settler James O'Neill (arrived 1845) 
 Karl Fraser Road - Karl Fraser, first CEO of Don Mills Development and assistant to developer E.P. Taylor
 Leadly Lane - named for local settler Allison Leadley (arrived 1850) 
 Pabst Lane - named for local settler Rudolph Pabst (arrived 1814) 
 Marie Labatte Road - named for former North York Councillor for Ward 10 and Metro Councillor for Don Parkway Marie Labatte (1925–2004)
 Sampson Mews - named for local settler James Sampson (arrived 1838) 
 Maginn Mews - named for merchant, school trustee and politician Charles Maginn (arrived 1841)

References

External links
Official site
Spacing Toronto article

Shopping malls established in 2009
Shopping malls in Toronto
North York
Lifestyle centers (retail)
Cadillac Fairview